"The Lamp Is Low" is a popular song of the 1930s.  The music was written by Peter DeRose and Bert Shefter, adapted from Pavane pour une infante défunte, a piece by Maurice Ravel. The lyrics were written by Mitchell Parish.

Mildred Bailey made the first notable recording of "The Lamp is Low" for Vocalion Records (catalog No. 4845) on April 24, 1939. Covers by other musicians quickly followed, including one by Tommy Dorsey and His Orchestra (vocal by Jack Leonard) recorded on May 1, 1939 for Victor Records (catalog No. 26259). The Dorsey version was a big hit and helped the song to feature on the hit parade in 1939 for nine weeks. The song continues to be a favorite of jazz musicians.

Other recordings 
Dorothy Lamour - Bluebird-B-10302-A - recorded on April 26, 1939 with Lou Bring's Orchestra.
Kay Kyser and his Orchestra, (vocal by Ginny Simms), recorded April 30, 1939.
Glenn Miller and his Orchestra (vocal by Ray Eberle), recorded for Bluebird Records on May 25, 1939.
Jimmy Dorsey and his Orchestra, recorded for Decca Records (catalog No.2579A) on June 16, 1939.
Connee Boswell - recorded on June 26, 1939 for Decca Records (catalog No. 2597A) with the Harry Sosnik Orchestra.
Doris Day recorded it in 1958 for her Day by Night album. 
Steve Lawrence - for the album Swing Softly with Me  (1959).
Robert Goulet - in his album Always You (1962).
Patti Page - included in her album Love After Midnight (1964)
Ella Fitzgerald recorded this song on her album 30 by Ella (1968).  
Laurindo Almeida - for his album Classical Current (1969).  
Carmen Lundy - for her album Good Morning Kiss (1986).
Robin McKelle - for her album Introducing Robin McKelle (2006). 
Kate McGarry - for her album The Target (2007).

Some samples of the Laurindo Almeida version were used by Nujabes to record Aruarian Dance in the 2004 Samurai Champloo Music Record: Departure album, one of the soundtrack albums from the anime Samurai Champloo.

References

Songs with music by Peter DeRose
Songs with music by Bert Shefter
Songs with lyrics by Mitchell Parish
1939 songs
Mildred Bailey songs
Bluebird Records singles